PeacePlayers International is a non-profit organization which uses the game of basketball to unite and educate children and their communities.

Goals 
PeacePlayers International has four main objectives:

 Bridge social divides
 Develop future leaders
 Educate children to lead healthy, constructive lives
 Build community involvement to ensure long-term sustainability

Background 
PeacePlayers International was founded in 2001 on the premise that “children who play together can learn to live together.” PeacePlayers International effectively blends together proven theories of social modeling, conflict resolution and public diplomacy to operate basketball and life-skills programs in historically divided regions that bring together thousands of children from different religious, racial, and cultural backgrounds.

The programs attract children to participate in basketball and life-skills activities that enable them to learn leadership skills and how to live as friends and neighbors. A key component to PeacePlayers International's effectiveness is that the programs target children aged 10–14. These are the children old enough to pick up the basics of the sport, but young enough that many prejudices have not yet been cemented. Through the power of sport and education and the strategic integration of public diplomacy, PeacePlayers International is altering the pattern of preconceived prejudice and equipping children with the skills and education needed to address the serious social and health issues they face.

In 2017, NIKE partnered with Peaceplayers International to promote equality in communities across the United States through the power of sport.

South Africa 
Since inception, PeacePlayers International - South Africa has:

•  Taught the game of basketball to over 25,000 children from the city of Durban, its suburbs and its surrounding townships 

•  Actively involved 7,000 10- to 14-year-old boys and girls from 98 schools who participate in inter-community leagues, life skills clinics, tournaments and clubs 

•  Trained and employed 100 young South African adults to serve as coaches and youth mentors 

•  Built 45 outdoor basketball courts each of which is affixed with AIDS awareness message 

•  Held eight tournaments each involving over 2,000 children who participate on mixed teams 

•  Developed and implemented a program-wide HIV/AIDS Awareness initiative in partnership with Harvard University's School of Public Health and the University of Natal.

•  Become a registered charity in South Africa led by an active board of directors 

•  Enlisted funding from the Laureus Sport for Good Foundation, The Nelson Mandela's Children Fund, the South African government and several corporate sponsors

Northern Ireland
In August 2002, PeacePlayers International extended its program to Northern Ireland with the mission to use basketball to address sectarianism and foster mutual respect and tolerance among Catholic and Protestant children.

PeacePlayers International - Northern Ireland (PPI-NI)'s programs include: 

 Primary School Twinnings – Entire classes of children in grades 5 and 6 (ages 8-11) from neighboring Protest and Catholic primary schools come together for basketball and community relations sessions in mixed groups. PPI – NI works regularly with 16 schools in all. Beginning in Fall 2010, PPI – NI began work with grade 4 students (ages 7-8).
 Cross-Community League (CCL) – Children of all backgrounds ages 9-17 from community centers, clubs, churches and other youth groups come together for integrated basketball and community relations discussions in strategically located community centres. Activities occur in a structured, fun, and inclusive environment after school and on weekends. PPI – NI currently works with twelve community centres in Belfast.
 Leadership Development Programme (LDP) – In partnership with the International Fund for Ireland, PPI – NI recruits 16- to 25-year-old young people with outstanding leadership potential for year-round leadership, life skills and community relations training, anchored by monthly workshops and quarterly residential retreats.
 Developing Integrated Sports Clubs (DISC) – DISC aims to cultivate sustainable integrated multi-sport clubs in Northern Ireland. As a first step, PPI – NI has developed three Open College Network-accredited courses to help capacitate other sports organizations for community relations and peacebuilding work.
 Tournaments - PPI-NI hosts three annual basketball tournaments for 9- to 13-year-olds each year: Spring Jam (spring time), Monster Mash (Halloween time), and Jingle Ball (Christmas time).

On Wednesday 11 July 2007, David Cullen and Trevor Ringland received the Arthur Ashe award for Courage at the 2007 ESPY awards

Middle East 

In June 2005, PeacePlayers International initiated a year-round program in Israel and the West Bank (PPI-ME) that facilitates positive dialogue and fosters tolerance and multiculturalism between Jewish and Arab youth and young adults. The program involves two main components. First, PeacePlayers International engenders meaningful interaction between Arab and Jewish children in Israel and the West Bank through joint basketball activities and life skills sessions which take place regularly throughout the entire school year. Second, PPI-ME operates a single identity program in the West Bank that provides constructive outlets for children and employment and leadership opportunities for young Palestinian adults. All initiatives are created with input from the local communities who work with PPI Program Directors and local coaches to build specialized programming.

Since September 2005, PeacePlayers International - Middle East has:

 Worked with more than 2,000 children
 Trained and employed over 70 adults from both sides as coaches, mentors and leaders
 Established sixteen joint basketball clubs that provide opportunities for regular interaction    for Jewish, Israeli Arab and Palestinian children
 Developed “BasketPal” programs in the West Bank cities of TulKarm and Ramallah
 Implemented teambuilding and leadership activities into all programming

Program Activities Include:

   Twinned Basketball Clubs – a network of youth basketball clubs in which Israeli, Jewish, Israeli Arab and Palestinian children play together on integrated teams under the guidance of a diverse group of coaches. All players and coaches partake in weekly peace education workshops.
 Leadership Development Program – youth leadership and training program that equips Israeli and Arab young adults with the skills needed to make a positive difference in their communities and on the lives of the children with whom they work.
 “Basket Pal” – programs aim to build capacity and infrastructure in underprivileged areas of the West Bank. Weekly practice sessions and games provide constructive outlets for these at-risk children. PPI-ME trains young adults in these communities to serve as role models and mentors.
 Camps – summer basketball camps in Israel at which children compete on mixed teams and participate in a variety of teambuilding activities and peace education workshops.

New Orleans 

In the fall of 2007, PeacePlayers International is launching its first domestic program in New Orleans. This will be a large scale, multi-sport effort that seeks to assist in the transformation, education and unification of a post-Katrina New Orleans.

References

External links 
Official PeacePlayers International site
ESPN article

International charities
Organizations established in 2001
Charities based in Washington, D.C.